The white-eared giant rats, genus Hyomys, are a group of Old World rats from New Guinea.

Description 

Species
Genus Hyomys - white-eared giant rats
Western white-eared giant rat, Hyomys dammermani Stein, 1933
Eastern white-eared giant rat, Hyomys goliath Milne-Edwards, 1900

References

Rodent genera

Taxa named by Oldfield Thomas
Rodents of Papua New Guinea